The 2017–18 season was a season of Football in Nepal.

National teams

Nepal Men's national football team

2019 AFC Asian Cup qualifiers

Other National Team Matches 

* Nepal score always listed first

Nepal Women's national football team

Nepal national under-23 football team

2018 AFC U-23 Championship qualification

Nepal national under-17 football team

2018 AFC U-16 Championship qualification

2017 SAFF U-15 Championship 

Group Stage

Semifinal

Final

Nepal national under-20 football team

2017 SAFF U18 Championship

Domestic Competitions

2017-18 Martyr's Memorial A-Division League 

The 2017–18 Martyr's Memorial A-Division League (Nepali: 2017-18 शहीद स्मारक ए डिभिजन लीग) is the upcoming edition of the Martyr's Memorial A-Division League, Nepal's highest ranked football league. The league is scheduled to begin on 30 November 2017.

Other Domestic Tournaments

References 

 
2017 in Nepalese sport
2018 in Nepalese sport
2017 in association football
2018 in association football
Seasons in Nepalese football